Les Cabannes is a railway station in Les Cabannes, Occitanie, France. The station is on the Portet-Saint-Simon–Puigcerdà railway. The station is served by TER (local) and Intercités de nuit (night) services operated by the SNCF.

Train services
The following services currently call at Les Cabannes:
night service Paris-Pamiers-Foix–Latour-de-Carol-Enveitg
local service (TER Occitanie) Toulouse–Foix–Latour-de-Carol-Enveitg

Bus Services

Bus services depart from the town centre of Les Cabannes towards Ax-les-Thermes, Luzenac, Ussat-les-Bains, Tarascon-sur-Ariège, Mercus-Garrabet, Saint-Paul-de-Jarrat, Montgaillard, Foix, Saint-Jean-de-Verges, Varilhes and Pamiers.

References

Railway stations in Ariège (department)
Railway stations in France opened in 1888